Nanopsocus is a genus of thick barklice in the family Pachytroctidae. There are about five described species in Nanopsocus.

Species
These five species belong to the genus Nanopsocus:
 Nanopsocus falsus Badonnel, 1977
 Nanopsocus longicornis Badonnel, 1976
 Nanopsocus oceanicus Pearman, 1928
 Nanopsocus pictus Baz, 1990
 Nanopsocus trifasciatus (Badonnel, 1969)

References

Pachytroctidae
Articles created by Qbugbot